The California Collegiate Athletic Association (CCAA) is a college athletic conference affiliated with the National Collegiate Athletic Association (NCAA) at the Division II level. All of its current members are public universities, and upon UC San Diego's departure on July 1, 2020, all are members of the California State University system (two of them being Cal Polys).

It was founded in December 1938 and began competition in 1939. The commissioner of the CCAA is Mitch Cox. CCAA offices are located in Chico, California. The CCAA is the most successful conference in NCAA Division II, as its former and current members have won 155 National Championships.

History

Chronological timeline
 1938 - The California Collegiate Athletic Association (CCAA) was founded. Charter members included Fresno State Normal School (now California State University, Fresno or Fresno State University), San Diego State College (now San Diego State University), San Jose State College (now San Jose State University) and Santa Barbara State College (now the University of California, Santa Barbara), effective beginning the 1939–40 academic year.
 1945 - George Pepperdine College (now Pepperdine University) and California State Polytechnic College (now California Polytechnic State University, San Luis Obispo) joined the CCAA, effective in the 1945–46 academic year.
 1946 - The College of the Pacific (now the University of the Pacific) joined the CCAA, effective in the 1946–47 academic year.
 1949 - Pacific (Cal.) left the CCAA to join the Division I ranks of the National Collegiate Athletic Association (NCAA) as an NCAA Independent, effective after the 1948–49 academic year.
 1949 - San Jose State left the CCAA to join the NCAA Division I ranks as an NCAA Independent, effective after the 1949–50 academic year.
 1950 - The Los Angeles State College of Applied Arts and Sciences (now California State University, Los Angeles) joined the CCAA, effective in the 1950–51 academic year.
 1954 - Pepperdine left the CCAA to join the NCAA Division I ranks as an NCAA Independent, effective after the 1953–54 academic year.
 1956 - Long Beach State College (now California State University, Long Beach) joined the CCAA, effective in the 1956–57 academic year.
 1961 - San Fernando Valley State College (now California State University, Northridge) joined the CCAA, effective in the 1961–62 academic year.
 1967 - California State College at Fullerton (now California State University, Fullerton) and California State Polytechnic College, Kellogg-Voorhis (now California State Polytechnic University, Pomona) joined the CCAA, effective in the 1967–68 academic year.
 1969 - Cal State–Los Angeles, Fresno State, Long Beach State, San Diego State and UC Santa Barbara left the CCAA to join the Division I ranks of the National Collegiate Athletic Association (NCAA) and form the Pacific Collegiate Athletic Association (PCAA; now known as the Big West Conference), effective after the 1968–69 academic year.
 1969 - The University of California, Riverside joined the CCAA, effective in the 1969–70 academic year.
 1972 - California State College, Bakersfield (now California State University, Bakersfield) joined the CCAA, effective in the 1972–73 academic year.
 1974 - Cal State–Fullerton left the CCAA to join the PCAA, effective after the 1973–74 academic year.
 1974 - Cal State–Los Angeles re-joined back to the CCAA, effective in the 1974–75 academic year.
 1978 - Chapman College (now Chapman University) joined the CCAA, effective in the 1978–79 academic year.
 1980 - California State University, Dominguez Hills joined the CCAA, effective in the 1980–81 academic year.
 1990 - Cal State–Northridge left the CCAA to join the NCAA Division I ranks as an NCAA D-I Independent (who would later join the American West Conference, effective beginning the 1994–95 academic year), effective after the 1989–90 academic year.
 1991 - California State University, San Bernardino joined the CCAA, effective in the 1991–92 academic year.
 1993 - Chapman left the CCAA to join the NCAA Division III ranks as an NCAA D-III Independent, effective after the 1992–93 academic year.
 1994 - Cal Poly–San Luis Obispo left the CCAA to join the NCAA Division I ranks and the American West, effective after the 1993–94 academic year.
 1994 - Grand Canyon University joined the CCAA, effective in the 1994–95 academic year.
 1998 - California State University, Chico, California State University, Stanislaus, San Francisco State University, Sonoma State University and the University of California, Davis joined the CCAA, effective in the 1998–99 academic year.
 2000 - UC Riverside left the CCAA to join the NCAA Division I ranks and the Big West Conference, effective after the 1999–2000 academic year.
 2000 - University of California, San Diego joined the CCAA, effective in the 2000–01 academic year.
 2004 - Two institutions left the CCAA to join their respective new home primary conferences: Grand Canyon as an NCAA D-II Independent (who would later join the Pacific West Conference (PacWest), effective beginning the 2005–06 academic year), and UC Davis to join the NCAA Division I ranks as an NCAA D-I Independent (who would later join the Big West, effective beginning the 2007–08 academic year), effective after the 2003–04 academic year.
 2004 - California State University, Monterey Bay joined the CCAA, effective in the 2004–05 academic year.
 2006 - Humboldt State University (now California State Polytechnic University, Humboldt) joined the CCAA, effective in the 2006–07 academic year.
 2007 - Cal State–Bakersfield left the CCAA to join the NCAA Division I ranks as an NCAA D-I Independent (who would later join the Western Athletic Conference (WAC), effective beginning the 2013–14 academic year), effective after the 2006–07 academic year.
 2009 - California State University, East Bay joined the CCAA, effective in the 2009–10 academic year.
 2015 - California State University, San Marcos joined the CCAA, effective in the 2015–16 academic year.
 2020 - UC San Diego left the CCAA to join the NCAA Division I ranks and the Big West, effective after the 2019–20 academic year.

Member schools

Current members
The CCAA currently has 12 full members, all of which are public schools in the California State University system.

Notes

Former members
The CCAA had 16 former full members, all but four were public schools. Institutional names and nicknames reflect those used in the final academic year of CCAA membership:

Notes

Membership timeline

Sports sponsored

The CCAA sponsors seven sports for women and six sports for men. Cross country, soccer and volleyball are fall sports; basketball is a winter sport; golf, outdoor track & field, softball, and baseball are spring sports. Throughout the years, CCAA teams have won 155 NCAA championships in their sports, which is best among all Division II conferences.

The CCAA has a Student-Athlete Advisory Committee, which is made up of student-athletes from each member institution.

Men's sponsored sports by school

Women's sponsored sports by school

Other sponsored sports by school

CCAA championships

Basketball

Football

NCAA championships

Conference facilities

See also

Big West Conference, a Division I conference that consists predominantly of California schools. Of its 11 current members, nine (Hawaii and UC Irvine being the exceptions) are former members of the CCAA.
California Pacific Conference, an NAIA conference that consisted entirely of California schools from its formation in 1996 until 2012.
Golden State Athletic Conference, an NAIA conference that consisted entirely of California schools from its formation in 1986 until 2012.

References

External links